Hamilton Branch may refer to:

Hamilton Branch (railway), a railway in Scotland
Hamilton Branch, California, a census-designated place
Hamilton Branch (Florida), a stream in Florida

See also
Hamilton Creek (disambiguation)